KBS World is the Korean Broadcasting System's international broadcasting service. It consists of KBS World Radio, KBS World television channel and KBS Korea.

History 
The foreign-language radio broadcast from KBS (before its restructure into a public broadcaster in March 1973) was started as "The Voice of Free Korea" in 1953. It officially became a part of KBS in July 1968. The station was renamed Radio Korea in March 1973, and then Radio Korea International in August 1994.

In July 2003, KBS World, an international television channel aimed at Koreans abroad, started broadcasting. In March 2005, Radio Korea International became KBS World Radio. Most of the programs are subtitled for the audience they are broadcast to, in languages such as English, Chinese, Malay, Vietnamese, and Indonesian.

Services

Radio 

KBS World Radio is South Korea's sole foreign language promotional broadcast for the entire world. Its programming features news, culture, music, entertainment, as well as Korean lessons.

KBS World Radio currently broadcasts in Korean, English, Japanese, French, Russian, Mandarin, Spanish, Indonesian, Arabic, German, Vietnamese and Cantonese.

Television 

KBS World's TV programming is sourced from KBS's domestic television services. It mainly broadcast in Korean, but subtitles in English, Malay and Chinese are also provided.

There are four separate general entertainment KBS World services operated by KBS's subsidiaries tailored to specific markets: the Japanese version of KBS World, operated by KBS Japan, targets Japanese audiences, the Indonesian version of KBS World, operated by OKTN, targets Indonesian audiences, while KBS America (in English) and KBS Latino (in Spanish) target audiences in North and South America.

Additionally, KBS World 24 was a news and documentary channel that was available for free online. On July 1, 2021, the channel was reformulated as KBS Korea, with a broader focus.

References

External links 
 

2003 establishments in South Korea
International broadcasters
Korean Broadcasting System subsidiaries
Korean-language television stations
Television channels and stations established in 2003
Television channels in South Korea